= Ground pounder =

Ground pounder may refer to:

- Walking
- A slang term for infantry soldiers
- A slang term for Attack aircraft
